Petros Panopoulos (el: Πέτρος Πανόπουλος) is a former Greek footballer born on 22 January, 1944. He played in the position of goalkeeper.

He started his career with Palamiaki as a striker and then established himself as a goalkeeper. He played in the A.S. Lamia from the first year of its establishment and served the team as a footballer, coach and agent. In 1968 he was named top goalkeeper of the Second National Division.

It was a transfer goal of Marton Bukovi to Olympiakos while training at Renti but he was eventually transferred together with Antonis Antoniadis to Panathinaikos in 1968. 
He played for Panathinaikos until 1972. He was a member of the team that participated in the final of the Champions Cup in 1971. He failed to establish himself as a key player in the team as he found himself in the shadow of two goalkeepers who were among the best in the history of Panathinaikos, Takis Ikonomopoulos and Vasilis Konstantinou.

He then moved to Byzantas Megaron and AO Chania, completing his career in 1979.

He contributed to the technical staff of Panathinaikos in the 1980's by working as a coach and assistant coach as a personal choice of Yiorgos Vardinogiannis. He worked alongside Vassilis Daniil, Gunder Bengtsson, Christo Bonev and Ivica Osim. He won Championships and Cups having coached players such as Saravakos, Zaets, Rocha, Sarganis, Vazeha. At the beginning of his career, he took over Antonis Nikopolidis.

He discovered Niki Bakoyanni and convinced her to take up the high jump at the age of 12.

References

1944 births
Living people
Greek footballers
Super League Greece players
Panathinaikos F.C. players
Association football goalkeepers
Greek football managers